St. Marks National Wildlife Refuge is one of the oldest wildlife refuges in the United States. Established in 1931 as a wintering ground for migratory birds, it encompasses 68,000 acres (280 km2) spread between Wakulla, Jefferson, and Taylor Counties in the state of Florida.

The refuge includes several Gulf of Mexico coastal habitats, such as saltwater marshes, islands, tidal creeks, and the estuaries of seven north Florida rivers. It is home to a diverse range of plant and animal life and also has a long history of human use, including structures such as the St. Marks Lighthouse, the second oldest lighthouse in Florida.

The refuge is a 'gateway site' for the Great Florida Birding Trail.

St. Marks National Wildlife Refuge offers many different attractions to outdoor enthusiasts.  The refuge is inhabited by black bears, bobcats, otters, raccoons, foxes, coyotes, amphibians, alligators, snakes, and many different species of birds including wading birds, shorebirds, waterfowl and raptors.  During migrations, bird species and numbers dramatically increase.  There are numerous fishing venues and many different freshwater and saltwater fish for fishing enthusiasts.  A boat ramp near the lighthouse offers direct access to the St. Marks River and subsequently, the Gulf of Mexico.  The boat ramp is subject to tidal influence and low tides may affect launching and retrieving abilities.  Kayakers have direct access to the Gulf from the Lighthouse parking lot.  Hikers and cyclists have their choice of miles of impoundments and trails to traverse through widely varied habitats and ecosystems. There is a biking trail that runs about 20 miles from south side of Tallahassee all the way down to the nearby town of St. Marks following an old railroad corridor. The St. Marks NWR also offers a wide range of subjects and settings for artistic expression via sketching and drawing, painting and photography.  The refuge has a large Visitors Center with maps and brochures to help the visitors enjoy their trip.  Inside the Visitors Center is a bookstore offering a wide variety of books and merchandise for sale.  Next door to the Visitors Center is the Education building offering comfortable meeting facilities in one half of the building and facilities and staff devoted to education in the other half.

The refuge attracts a large volunteer base that assists the U.S. Fish and Wildlife Service by volunteering for research projects, outreach, and public events such as educational field trips, festivals, and historical celebrations. St. Marks NWR has a friends group in the St. Marks Refuge Association and a photography club, and the two organizations are prolific suppliers of volunteers for the refuge.

The St. Marks National Wildlife Refuge is home to a wintering site for the endangered whooping cranes that are led south by the ultra-light aircraft of Operation Migration. Operation Migration begins training whooping crane chicks with the aircraft shortly after birth and continue to the time of migration when they act as surrogate parents leading the birds south and imprinting their first annual migration. The refuge is also a stopping point for the yearly monarch butterfly migration. A festival is hosted annually around the time of the migration each October to educate people on the practice of tagging monarchs as they continue through their migration.

The St. Marks National Wildlife Refuge also served as the inspiration for the setting of author Jeff VanderMeer's Southern Reach Trilogy.

Wilderness
Designated in 1975 by the U.S. Congress as part of the National Wilderness Preservation System, the St. Marks Wilderness makes up 17,350 acres of the refuge. The Florida National Scenic Trail traverses the refuge for 41 miles including through a portion of the wilderness area.

Access
Public accesses to the refuge are located at:
Panacea Unit
Otter Lake, in Panacea
Bottoms Road, in Panacea
Skipper Bay Road, south of Medart (may be closed)
Wakulla Unit
Purify Bay Road, in Medart
Shell Point Highway, north of Shell Point
Wakulla Beach Road, east of Shell Point
St. Marks Unit
Lighthouse Road, the main entrance, in Newport
Mandalay Bay Road, just east of the Aucilla River in Taylor County.

There is no paved public access to the refuge in Jefferson County.

References

External links 

St. Marks National Wildlife Refuge

Protected areas of Jefferson County, Florida
National Wildlife Refuges in Florida
Protected areas of Taylor County, Florida
Protected areas of Wakulla County, Florida
Protected areas established in 1931
Wetlands of Florida
Landforms of Jefferson County, Florida
Landforms of Taylor County, Florida
Landforms of Wakulla County, Florida